Jean-Marc Marino (born 15 August 1983 in Castres) is a French former professional road bicycle racer, who rode professionally between 2006 and 2014 for the ,  and  teams.

Major results

2004
 5th La Roue Tourangelle
 6th Overall Ronde de l'Isard
 7th Paris–Mantes-en-Yvelines
2005
 1st La Côte Picarde
 6th Overall Ronde de l'Isard
2006
 6th Overall Tour du Poitou-Charentes
2007
 2nd Flèche Ardennaise
 5th Overall La Tropicale Amissa Bongo
 5th Grand Prix de Plumelec-Morbihan
2008
 8th Overall Tour de Langkawi
2010
 8th Overall Tour Méditerranéen
2011
 7th Route Adélie
 7th Paris–Troyes
 9th Overall Route du Sud
 9th Tour du Finistère
2012
 8th Paris–Camembert

References

External links 
Profile at Crédit Agricole official website 

1983 births
Living people
People from Castres
French male cyclists
Sportspeople from Tarn (department)
Cyclists from Occitania (administrative region)